Yukon is an unincorporated community on Dry Fork in McDowell County, West Virginia, United States. It lies at the intersection of West Virginia State Routes 16 and 83. According to the Geographic Names Information System, Yukon has also been known throughout its history as Susanna and Watson.

Yukon is on the Norfolk Southern Railway(former Norfolk and Western) network and the Tug Fork river.

References 

Unincorporated communities in McDowell County, West Virginia
Unincorporated communities in West Virginia
Coal towns in West Virginia